Godefroid Mana Kangudie (3 November 1953 – 15 July 2021), known by his pen name Kä Mana was a Congolese writer, professor, and theologian. He was one of the most famous philosophers in the Democratic Republic of the Congo and served as President of the POLE Institute.

He died from the effects of COVID-19 in July 2021 at the age of 67. He lectured Ethics and Philosophy of Peace at Université Evangélique en Afrique, UEA Bukavu DRC. Kä Mana was probably the most famous and most knowledgeable scholar of his time in the DRC and Africa. He also lectured at UPAC in Cameroon. Some of his scholarly works include Changer la République Démocratique du Congo. He was passionate about the youth and showed great devotion to young people's empowerment through education. He was quite knowledgeable of the History of the DRC and Africa. A fervent Africanist scholar who shared many values in common with other contemporary African public intellectuals like  CheikhAnta Diop, Theophile Obenga, Achille Mbembe and Mudimbe Vumbi Yoka.

1953 births
2021 deaths
Deaths from the COVID-19 pandemic in the Democratic Republic of the Congo
Democratic Republic of the Congo writers
Democratic Republic of the Congo academics
Democratic Republic of the Congo theologians
Democratic Republic of the Congo philosophers
21st-century Democratic Republic of the Congo people